MindMaze is an American progressive power metal band from Allentown, Pennsylvania. Founded in 2012 by siblings Sarah Teets and Jeff Teets, the band also includes bassist Rich Pasqualone and drummer Mark "Truk" Bennett.

MindMaze has performed in 18 different U.S. States and toured with Saxon, Armored Saint and Iris Divine. Their first album, Mask of Lies, sold in 34 out of 50 states in the United States and in 17 countries through independent funding. Their second album, Back From The Edge, was released via Inner Wound Recordings and features Symphony X bassist Michael Lepond and guest appearances by members of Stratovarius, Pharaoh, Lord, and Draekon. Their third album, Resolve, was released in 2017.

Musical style 
MindMaze draws influences from Iron Maiden, Dream Theater, Fates Warning, Queensrÿche, Riot V, Savatage, Dio, Black Sabbath, Kansas, Rush, Avantasia, Evergrey, Gamma Ray, Thin Lizzy, UFO, Saxon, and Symphony X.

Personnel

Current members 
 Sarah Teets – lead vocals
 Jeff Teets – guitars, keyboards, backing vocals
 Rich Pasqualone – bass, backing vocals
 Mark "Truk" Bennett – drums

Past members 
 Kalin Schweizerhof

Discography

Mask of Lies 
Release Date: February 17, 2013
 Never Look Back
 Breaking the Chains
 This Holy War
 Cosmic Overture
 Fading Skies
 Mask of Lies
 Dark City
 Remember
 Destiny Calls

Back From the Edge 
Release Date: October 24, 2014
 Back from the Edge
 Through the Open Door
 Moment of Flight
 Dreamwalker
 The Machine Stops
 Consequence of Choice
 End of Eternity
 Onward (Destiny Calls II)

Dreamwalker (EP) 
Release Date: July 20, 2015
 Dreamwalker
 Arena of Pleasure (W.A.S.P cover)
 Slave to the Cycle
 Promises in the Dark (Pat Benatar cover)
 Remember (acoustic)
 Strange Wings (Savatage cover)
 Dreamwalker (Duet Version featuring Urban Breed)

Resolve 
Release Date: April 28, 2017
 Reverie
 Fight the Future
 In This Void
 Drown Me
 Sign of Life
 Abandon
 Sanity's Collapse
 One More Moment
 Twisted Dream
 True Reflection
 Shattered Self
 Release
 The Path to Perseverance

Awards 
Lehigh Valley Music Awards 2019 - BEST METAL BAND
Lehigh Valley Music Awards 2015 - BEST METAL BAND
WZZO Mötley Crüe Contest - WINNERS
WZZO Backyard Bands 2013 - Runner-Up
Reddit /r/ Power Metal - WINNER: Best Debut Album of 2013
When Prog and Power Unite - WINNER: Album of the Year 2013

References

External links 

Official Web Site - http://www.mindmazeband.com/
Facebook - https://www.facebook.com/mindmazeband/
Inner Wound Recordings - http://www.innerwound.com/
Stage set for Lehigh Valley Music Awards 2016 (March 3, 2016) - http://www.lehighvalleylive.com/entertainment/index.ssf/2016/03/lehigh_valley_music_awards_mar.html

Living people
Musical groups established in 2012
Musical groups from Pennsylvania
Year of birth missing (living people)
2012 establishments in Pennsylvania